The 1970 Cambodian coup d'état was the removal of the Cambodian Chief of State, Prince Norodom Sihanouk, after a vote in the National Assembly on 18 March 1970. Emergency powers were subsequently invoked by the Prime Minister Lon Nol, who became effective head of state, and led ultimately to the removal of Queen Sisowath Kossamak and the proclamation of the Khmer Republic later that year.  It is generally seen as a turning point in the Cambodian Civil War. No longer a monarchy, Cambodia was semi-officially called "État du Cambodge" (State of Cambodia) in the intervening six months after the coup, until the republic was proclaimed.

It also marked the change of Cambodia involvement in the Vietnam War, as Lon Nol issued an ultimatum to North Vietnamese forces to leave Cambodia.

Background 

Since independence from France in 1954, Cambodia had been led by Prince Norodom Sihanouk, whose Sangkum political movement secured complete political power after the 1955 parliamentary election, where no opposition candidate secured a single seat. Following King Norodom Suramarit's death in 1960, Sihanouk had forced the National Assembly to approve a constitutional amendment that made him Chief of State with no fixed term of office, while Queen Sisowath Kossamak remained a mere ceremonial figure. He had retained domestic power through a combination of political manipulation, intimidation, patronage, and careful balancing of left- and right-wing elements within his government; whilst placating the right with nationalist rhetoric, he appropriated much of the language of socialism to marginalize the Cambodian communist movement, whom he called the Khmers rouges ("Red Khmers").

With the Second Indochina War escalating, Sihanouk's balancing act between left and right became harder to maintain. Cross-border smuggling of rice also began to have a serious effect on the Cambodian economy. In the Cambodian elections of 1966, the usual Sangkum policy of having one candidate in each electoral district was abandoned; there was a huge swing to the right, especially as left-wing deputies had to compete directly with members of the traditional elite, who were able to use their local influence. Although a few communists within the Sangkum – such as Hou Yuon and Khieu Samphan – chose to stand, most leftists were decisively defeated. Lon Nol, a rightist who had been a longstanding associate of Sihanouk, became Prime Minister.

By 1969, Lon Nol and the rightists were growing increasingly frustrated with Sihanouk. Although the basis for this was partly economic, political considerations were also involved. In particular, the nationalist and anti-communist sensibilities of Lon Nol and his associates meant that Sihanouk's policy of semi-toleration of Viet Cong and People's Army of Vietnam (PAVN) activity within Cambodian borders was unacceptable; Sihanouk, during his swing to the left in 1963–66, had negotiated a secret arrangement with Hanoi whereby in return for the guaranteed purchase of rice at inflated prices, the port of Sihanoukville was opened for weapons shipments to the Viet Cong. As well as the rightist nationalists, the liberal modernising elements within the Sangkum, headed by In Tam, had also become increasingly alienated by Sihanouk's autocratic style.

Overthrow of Sihanouk 
In early March 1970, anti-Vietnamese demonstrations occurred in Cambodia while Sihanouk was touring Europe, the Soviet Union and China.  William Shawcross has suggested that Lon Nol planned the first demonstrations in eastern Cambodia on 8 March. On 11 March in Phnom Pehn, crowds, said to have been organised by Lon Nol's brother, Lon Non, attacked the embassies of North Vietnam and the PRGR South Vietnam. Vietnamese residences, businesses and churches were also attacked. Some reports indicate Sihanouk's involvment in the preparations, or acquiesence, of the demonstrations, in the hope that they would lead Moscow and Beijing to pressure North Vietnam to reduce its presence in Cambodia.

The riots escalated beyond the government's control – although this was likely done with a degree of encouragement from Lon Nol and Sirik Matak – and the embassy was sacked. Inside, a "contingency plan" was allegedly found for the communists to occupy Cambodia. On 12 March, Sirik Matak cancelled North Vietnam's trade agreement that gave access to Cambodian goods. Lon Nol closed the port of Sihanoukville to the North Vietnamese and issued an impossible ultimatum to them: all PAVN and Viet Cong forces were to withdraw from Cambodian soil within 72 hours (on 15 March) or face military action. When, by the morning of 16 March, it was clear that this demand had not been met, some 30,000 youths gathered outside the National Assembly in Phnom Penh to protest against the Vietnamese presence.

From this point, events moved with increasing rapidity. On the same day, the Cambodian Secretary of State for Defence, Colonel Oum Mannorine (Sihanouk's brother-in-law), was scheduled to be questioned by the national legislature on allegations of corruption. The proceedings were adjourned to hear the demonstrators' resolutions. According to Sihanouk, Mannorine had received information that Lon Nol and Sirik Matak were about to precipitate a coup. A group of Mannorine's men, under the command of Phnom Penh's Chief of Police Major Buor Horl, attempted to arrest the plotters, but it was too late. Mannorine, and other key security personnel loyal to Sihanouk, were placed under arrest. After the Assembly adjourned for the day, Sihanouk's mother Queen Kossamak, at Sihanouk's request, summoned Lon Nol and Sirik Matak to the Royal Palace and asked them to end the demonstrations.

It appears to have been sometime during 16 or 17 March that Sirik Matak finally swayed Lon Nol to remove Sihanouk from the government. Lon Nol, who until that point may have been merely hoping that Sihanouk would end his relations with North Vietnam, showed some reluctance to take action against the Head of State: to convince him, Sirik Matak allegedly played him a tape-recorded press conference from Paris, in which Sihanouk threatened to execute them both on his return to Phnom Penh. The Prime Minister remained uncertain, with the result that Sirik Matak, accompanied by three army officers, compelled a weeping Lon Nol to sign the necessary documents at gunpoint.

The next day – 18 March – the army took up positions around the capital, and a debate was held within the National Assembly under In Tam's direction. One member of the Assembly (Kim Phon, later to be killed by pro-Sihanouk demonstrators in Kampong Cham) walked out of the proceedings in protest, though was not harmed at the time. The rest of the assembly voted unanimously to invoke Article 122 of the Cambodian constitution, which withdrew confidence in Sihanouk.

Lon Nol took over the powers of the Head of State on an emergency basis, while the position itself was taken by the President of the General Assembly, Cheng Heng. In Tam was confirmed as President of the Sangkum. The removal of Sihanouk had, therefore, followed essentially constitutional forms rather than being a blatant military takeover. These events marked the foundation of the Khmer Republic.

Queen Kossamak was forced to leave the royal palace by the new government. She was held in house arrest in a suburban villa before being allowed to join her son in Beijing for health reasons in 1973, and died there two years later.

Claimed United States involvement 
There is evidence that during 1969 Lon Nol approached the US military establishment to gauge military support for any action against Sihanouk. Lon Nol's appointee as deputy Prime Minister, Prince Sisowath Sirik Matak – a US-friendly nationalist and leader of the Cambodian business community – is thought to have suggested that Sihanouk should be assassinated, though Lon Nol rejected this plan as "criminal insanity".

Sihanouk himself thought that Sirik Matak (who he characterised as a jealous rival claimant to the Cambodian throne) backed by the U.S. Central Intelligence Agency (CIA), and in contact with exiled Sihanouk opponent Son Ngoc Thanh, had suggested the coup plan to Lon Nol in  1969. CIA involvement in the coup plot remains unproven, and Henry Kissinger later claimed that events would take the US government by surprise, but some observers believe it to be likely that at least some U.S. military intelligence agents were involved.

Demonstrations against the coup 
On 23 March, Sihanouk (via Beijing Radio) called for a general uprising against Lon Nol. Large-scale popular demonstrations calling for Sihanouk's return began in Kompong Cham, Takéo Province, and Kampot Province. The demonstrations in Kompong Cham became particularly violent, with two National Assembly deputies, Sos Saoun and Kim Phon, being killed by demonstrators on 26 March after driving to the town to negotiate. Lon Nol's brother, police official Lon Nil, was set upon in the nearby town of Tonle Bet by plantation workers and was also killed.

The demonstrations were suppressed with extreme brutality by the Cambodian army; there were several hundred deaths and thousands of arrests. Some witnesses spoke of tanks being used against crowds of unarmed civilians.

Aftermath 

Following the coup, North Vietnam forces invaded Cambodia in 1970 at the request of Khmer Rouge leader Nuon Chea. Thousands of Vietnamese were killed by Lon Nol's anti-communist forces and their bodies dumped in the Mekong River. Attacks against Vietnamese began after a demand by Lon Nol that all Vietnamese communists leave Cambodia. Phnom Penh's North Vietnamese embassy was ravaged by Cambodians.

Cambodia abandonded an international policy of neutrality and aligned with the United States.  President Nixon approved the resumption of US Military Aid to the country in April 1970, which saw the FANK grow from 35,000 in March to 202,000 by January 1971. 

Of the approximately 450,000 Vietnamese in Cambodia, 100,000 left the country and another 200,000 were forcibly repatriated to South Vietnam, reducing the estimated population of ethnic Vietnamese to 140,000 just five months after the coup. These events marked the start of the Cambodian Civil War, pitting Lon Nol's regime backed by US air power against the Khmer Rouge and North Vietnam. Lon Nol fled Cambodia in 1975 right before the Khmer Rouge's seizure of power.

See also 
 1997 clashes in Cambodia
 Bangkok Plot

References

Notes

Footnotes

Sources

Further reading
 U.S. Department of State; Foreign Relations, 1969–1976, Vietnam, January 1969 – July 1970
 Lt. Gen. Sak Sutsakhan (FANK), The Khmer Republic at War and the Final Collapse Department of the Army, Office of Chief of Military History, Washington DC, 20 november 1978, Part A, Part B, Part C, Part D

Khmer Republic 
Coup
Cambodian coup d'état, 1970
Republicanism in Cambodia
Conflicts in 1970